Die Prinzen ("The Princes") is a German band, consisting of former members of the Thomanerchor, and a former member of the Dresdner Kreuzchor.

Overview
Early albums consist of a cappella music. The band's first name was Die Herzbuben, but it was changed to Die Prinzen in 1991 to avoid confusion with the Volkstümliche Schlager duo Wildecker Herzbuben. The lyrics of their songs are often humorous, tongue-in-cheek critiques of German government or society. The group's most popular singles have been "Alles nur geklaut", "Gabi und Klaus", "Millionär", "Küssen verboten", "(Du musst ein) Schwein sein", "Mein Fahrrad", "Olli Kahn" (about German World Cup goalkeeper Oliver Kahn) and "Deutschland".

In reference to the group's name and the Brothers Grimm fairy-tale "The Frog Prince", the group's logo is a green frog wearing a crown. The frog logo has appeared in a number of album and single covers.

Their hit song "Millionär" appeared in the accompanying video to the German textbooks "Komm mit", "Stationen", and "Kontakte".

"Deutschland" is a very cultural and ironic song about everything in Germany. It was written by German songwriter Steve van Velvet.

Band members

Die Prinzen
 Sebastian Krumbiegel (5 June 1966); vocals, keyboard
 Tobias Künzel (26 May 1964); vocals, guitar, keyboard
 Wolfgang Lenk (4 September 1966, Leipzig); vocals, keyboard, guitar
 Jens Sembdner (20 January 1967); vocals, keyboard
 Henri Schmidt (17 August 1967, Leipzig); vocals

Backing band
 Ali (Alexander) Zieme (23 March 1971, Leipzig); drums
 Mathias Dietrich (24 November 1964, Leipzig); bass

Discography

Albums
 Das Leben ist grausam (1991)
 Das Leben ist grausam (a cappella)
 Küssen verboten (1992)
 Küssen verboten (a cappella)
 Alles nur geklaut (1993)
 Alles nur geklaut (a cappella)
 Schweine (1995)
 Alles mit'm Mund (1996)
 Ganz oben - Best of (1997)
 A-Cappella-Album (1997)
 So viel Spaß für wenig Geld (1999)
 So viel Spaß für wenig Geld (a cappella)
 Festplatte (1999)
 D (2001)
 Monarchie in Germany (2003)
 HardChor (2004)
 Akustisch live (2006)
 Die Prinzen Orchestral (2007)
 Die Neuen Männer (2008)
 Es war nicht alles schlecht (2010)
 Familienalbum (2015)
 Eine Nacht in der Oper (2015)
 Krone der Schöpfung (2021)

Videos
 VHS Das erste Video (1993)
 VHS Das Live Video (1994)
 DVD 10 Jahre Popmusik (2001)
 VHS 10 Jahre Popmusik (2001)
 DVD (two-disc) Akustisch live (2006)
 DVD Die Prinzen Orchestral (2007)

Singles
 Gabi und Klaus (1991)
 Millionär (1991)
 Mann im Mond (1992)
 Mein Fahrrad (1992)
 Küssen verboten (1992)
 Küssen verboten - Die Königlichen Remixe (1992)
 Bombe (1992)
 1x (1993)
 Alles nur geklaut (1993)
 Überall (1994)
 Du spinnst doch (1994)
 (Du mußt ein) Schwein sein (1995)
 Ich will ein Baby (1995)
 Alles mit'm Mund (1996)
 Hose runter (1996)
 Heute ha-ha-habe ich Geburtstag (1997)
 Ganz oben (1997)
 Junimond (1998)
 So viel Spaß für wenig Geld (1999)
 Sie will mich (1999)
 Deutschland (2001)
 Hier sind wir (2001)
 Popmusik (2001)
 Olli Kahn (2002)
 Tiere sind zum Essen da (2003)
 Chronisch pleite (2003)
 Dürfen darf man alles (2021)
 Alles nur geklaut 2021 (2021)
 Krone der Schöpfung (2021)

Charts

Singles

Albums

References

External links
 Official website 

East German musical groups
Musicians from Leipzig
Musical groups established in 1987
1987 establishments in East Germany
Hansa Records artists